Spermine synthase is an enzyme that in humans is encoded by the SMS gene.
The protein encoded by this gene belongs to the spermidine/spermine synthases family. This gene encodes a ubiquitous enzyme of polyamine metabolism.

Model organisms
				
Model organisms have been used in the study of SMS function. A conditional knockout mouse line, called Smstm1a(EUCOMM)Wtsi was generated as part of the International Knockout Mouse Consortium program — a high-throughput mutagenesis project to generate and distribute animal models of disease to interested scientists.

Male and female animals underwent a standardized phenotypic screen to determine the effects of deletion. Twenty three tests were carried out on mutant mice and six significant abnormalities were observed. Hemizygous males were infertile and thus it was not possible to produce homozygous mutant female mice. The remaining tests were therefore carried out on heterozygous mutant females and hemizygous males. Both displayed decreased grip strength while the males also had decreased body weight, length, bone mineral content and atypical peripheral blood lymphocyte counts.

References

Further reading

Genes mutated in mice